Play It Again Shan is an album by Cold Chillin' Records artist and Juice Crew member MC Shan. The album was released on April 11, 1990, under Cold Chillin' and Warner Bros. Records.

Track listing
Ain't It Good To You (feat. Carole Davis)
I Ran The Game
Ain't We Funkin'
It Ain't A Hip Hop Record
Death Was Quite A Surprise
Walking On Sunshine
Rock Stuff
Clap Your Hands
Music You Can Dance To
Time For Us To Defend Ourselves
It Don't Mean A Thing
I Want To Thank You
Got To Be Funky
Mic Line
How I Feel About You

Vinyl version omits tracks 7, 8, 14 & 15.

References

MC Shan albums
1990 albums
Cold Chillin' Records albums